Ilioupoli, also known as Ilioupoli–Grigoris Lambrakis, is an intermediate station on Athens Metro Line 2. It opened with the Elliniko extension on 26 July 2013. The station is adjacent to Vouliagmenis Avenue.

History

Ilioupoli originally opened without the Grigoris Lambrakis qualifier, but the Municipality of Ilioupoli had for years requested Attiko Metro to name the station after the anti-war activist, who was also a member of the Greek resistance. Attiko Metro agreed to change the station name to Ilioupoli-Grigoris Lambrakis, which came into effect on 22 May 2015.

References

Athens Metro stations
Railway stations opened in 2013
2013 establishments in Greece